Robert William de Souza Ribeiro (born 9 May 1992), commonly known as Robert William, is a Brazilian footballer who currently plays as a forward for União Frederiquense.

Career statistics

Club

Notes

References

1992 births
Living people
Brazilian footballers
Association football forwards
Treviso F.B.C. 1993 players
U.S. Lecce players
A.C. ChievoVerona players
Resende Futebol Clube players
Madureira Esporte Clube players
Rio Branco Atlético Clube players
Espírito Santo Futebol Clube players
Clube Esportivo Bento Gonçalves players
Ozone FC players
RoundGlass Punjab FC players
I-League 2nd Division players
Brazilian expatriate footballers
Brazilian expatriate sportspeople in Italy
Expatriate footballers in Italy
Brazilian expatriate sportspeople in Lebanon
Expatriate footballers in Lebanon
Brazilian expatriate sportspeople in India
Expatriate footballers in India
Al Shabiba Mazraa Beirut players